Tymofiy Oleksandrovych Sheremeta (born 6 October 1995) is a Ukrainian professional footballer who plays as a goalkeeper.

Career
Sheremeta is a product of Podillya and Metalurh Zaporizhzhia Youth Sportive School Systems. His first coaches were Oleksandr Porytskyi (at Podillya) and Oleksandr Rudyka (at Metalurh).

He made his debut for Metalurh Zaporizhzhia in the Ukrainian Premier League in the match against Dynamo Kyiv on 30 May 2015.

In 2019, Sheremeta joined Armenian club Lokomotiv Yerevan.

References

External links
 
 
 

1995 births
Living people
Sportspeople from Khmelnytskyi, Ukraine
Ukrainian footballers
Ukraine under-21 international footballers
Association football goalkeepers
FC Metalurh-2 Zaporizhzhia players
FC Metalurh Zaporizhzhia players
FK Riteriai players
FC Lokomotiv Yerevan players
FC Uzhhorod players
FC Košice (2018) players
FC Olimpik Donetsk players
Ukrainian Premier League players
Ukrainian First League players
Ukrainian Second League players
Ukrainian Amateur Football Championship players
A Lyga players
I Lyga players
Armenian First League players
2. Liga (Slovakia) players
Ukrainian expatriate footballers
Expatriate footballers in Lithuania
Ukrainian expatriate sportspeople in Lithuania
Expatriate footballers in Armenia
Ukrainian expatriate sportspeople in Armenia
Expatriate footballers in Slovakia
Ukrainian expatriate sportspeople in Slovakia